Consort Meng may refer to:

Princess Meng ( 413), Juqu Mengxun's wife
Empress Meng (1073–1131), Emperor Zhezong's wife

See also
Consort Meng Arrives, 2018 Chinese television series